Lavallee Point is the northernmost point of Shipton Ridge in the Allan Hills, Oates Land, Antarctica. It was reconnoitered by the New Zealand Antarctic Research Program Allan Hills Expedition (1964) who reported that they named the point after a Lieutenant Lavallee, U.S. Navy, who assisted in establishing the expedition in the Allan Hills.

References

Headlands of Oates Land